The following is a timeline of the history of the city of Reggio Emilia in the Emilia-Romagna region of Italy.

Prior to 18th century

 187 BCE - Via Aemilia (road) built through town.
 77 BCE - Roman tribune Marcus Junius Brutus the Elder assassinated. 
 328 BCE - Protasio, First known Bishop of Regium (Reggio Emilia) 
 409 BCE - Reggio sacked by Gothic 
 899 - Reggio sacked by Magyar forces.
 924 - Reggio sacked by Magyar forces.
 1168 - Reggio joins the Lombard League. 
 May 29, 1176 - Victorious Battle of Legnano (Italian Cities allies, Lombard league, against the Emperor)  
 June 25, 1183 Peace of Constance 

 1245 - Consuetudini (law) issued.
 1289 - Obizzo II d'Este in power.
 1409 - Este in power (until 1796).
 1452 - Duchy of Reggio established.
 1474 - Birth of Ludovico Ariosto, poet.
 1480 - Printing press in operation.
 1512 - Forces of Pope Julius II occupy Reggio.
 1523 - Este rule restored.
 1597 - Basilica della Ghiara construction begins.

18th-19th centuries
 1741 - Teatro della cittadella (theatre) opens.
 1746 - Accademia degli Ipocondriaci active.
 1798 - Biblioteca Nazionale (library) opens.
 1808 - Reggio becomes seat of the Crostolo department in the French Cisalpine Republic.
 1819 - Reale Accademia Reggiana di Scienze, Lettere ed Arti established.
 1830 - Musei Civici di Reggio Emilia (museum) active.
 1856 -  built.
 1857 - Teatro Municipale (theatre) opens.
 1859
 Reggio Emilia railway station opens.
 Reggio becomes part of the Kingdom of Piedmont-Sardinia.
 1860 - Gazzetta di Reggio newspaper begins publication.
 1861 - Reggio becomes part of the Kingdom of Italy.
 1862 - Chamber of Commerce established.
 1873 - Dismantling of the  begins.
 1887 -  (railway) in operation.
 1892 -  (railway) in operation.
 1897 - Population: 59,117.
 1900 - Basilica della Ghiara restored.

20th century

 1901
 Officine Meccaniche Reggiane manufactory in business.
 Camera del Lavoro established.
 1906 - Population: 64,548.
 1910 - Stadio Mirabello (stadium) built.
 1911
  (railway) in operation.
 Population: 70,419.
 1919 - A.C. Reggiana 1919 (football club) formed.
 1927 -  (railway) begins operating.
 1931 - Population: 91,040.
 1944 - 8 January: Bombing of Reggio by Allied forces during World War II.
 1945 - Cesare Campioli becomes mayor (until 1962).
 1965 - Istituto per la Storia della Resistenza e della Società contemporanea (history institute) active.
 1995 - Mapei Stadium – Città del Tricolore opens.

21st century

 2013 - Population: 163,928.
 2014 - Local election held; Luca Vecchi becomes mayor.

See also
 
 List of mayors of Reggio Emilia
 List of bishops of Reggio Emilia
 List of dukes of Reggio

Timelines of other cities in the macroregion of Northeast Italy:(it)
 Emilia-Romagna region: Timeline of Bologna; Ferrara; Forlì; Modena; Parma; Piacenza; Ravenna; Rimini
 Friuli-Venezia Giulia region: Timeline of Trieste
 Trentino-South Tyrol region: Timeline of Trento
 Veneto region: Timeline of Padua; Treviso; Venice; Verona; Vicenza

References

This article incorporates information from the Italian Wikipedia.

Bibliography

in English

in Italian
 Taccoli. Memorie di Reggio Emilia, Parma 1748
 
 
  (bibliography)
 U. Bassi. Reggio Emilia alla fine del sec. XVIII, 1895
 
 A. Balletti. Storia di Reggio nell'Emilia, 1925

External links

  (City archives, documenting 1870-1955)
 Archivio di Stato di Reggio Emilia (state archives)
 Items related to Reggio Emilia, various dates (via Europeana)
 Items related to Reggio Emilia, various dates (via Digital Public Library of America)

Reggio Emilia
Reggio Emilia
History of Reggio Emilia